Ivo "Ivan" Mrázek (18 January 1926 – 4 April 2019) was a Czech professional basketball player and coach. At 5'7 " (1.71 m) tall, he was a point guard. He was named one of FIBA's 50 Greatest Players, in 1991.

Playing career

Club career
In his club career, Mrázek won 6 Czechoslovak League championships (1947, 1948 2×, 1949, 1950, 1951).

National team career
Mrázek helped lead the senior Czechoslovakia national team to a EuroBasket gold medal at the EuroBasket 1946, as well as to three EuroBasket silver medals (1947, 1951, and 1955). Mrázek was the MVP and top scorer of EuroBasket 1951. He also represented Czechoslovakia in two Summer Olympic Games (1948 and 1952).

Coaching career
In his head basketball coaching career, Mrázek was a 6 time Czechoslovak League champion (1958, 1962, 1963, 1964, 1967, 1968).

Personal life
Mrázek was born named Ivo, but he was called Ivan by many, including his mother. Mrázek died on 4 April 2019. He was 93 years old.

References

External links
 FIBA.com Profile
 Fibaeurope.com Profile
 Ivan Mrázek's obituary  

1926 births
2019 deaths
Basketball players at the 1948 Summer Olympics
Basketball players at the 1952 Summer Olympics
BC Brno coaches
BC Brno players
Czech men's basketball players
Czechoslovak men's basketball players
Czech basketball coaches
Olympic basketball players of Czechoslovakia
Sportspeople from Brno
Pallacanestro Petrarca Padova coaches
Point guards